The Kenya Savannah Classic was a professional golf tournament that was held 23–26 March 2021 at Karen Country Club in Nairobi, Kenya. The principal sponsor was Absa Bank Limited.

The tournament was intended to be a one-off event and created a two-week "Kenyan swing" with the Magical Kenya Open being played at the same location the week prior.

Daniel van Tonder won the event, defeating Jazz Janewattananond in a playoff to claim his first European Tour victory.

Winners

References

External links
Event page on the official site of the European Tour

Former European Tour events
Golf tournaments in Kenya
Sport in Nairobi
2021 in Kenyan sport
2021 in golf